Alassane Bah (born 1960) is a Guinean long-distance runner. He competed in the men's marathon at the 1988 Summer Olympics.

References

1960 births
Living people
Athletes (track and field) at the 1988 Summer Olympics
Guinean male long-distance runners
Guinean male marathon runners
Olympic athletes of Guinea
Place of birth missing (living people)